Lynne & Tessa are two young women from Frankfurt, Germany, who have released internet videos of themselves lip-synching to famous pop songs that, for a brief period during 2006-2007, brought them a considerable online following as well as local media attention.

History 
In their videos, Lynne and Tessa mime to current pop hits, pulling exaggerated "emotive" faces while lip-syncing and performing a variety of silly gestures, overwrought dance moves, clever physical comedy routines, and other spontaneous and theatrical antics.

Lynne and Tessa have been featured on several German television channels, including RTL, Sat.1 and Pro 7, on the German radio station YOU FM, and in the print media. Their videos have met with great popularity and have been viewed more than 16 million times by people around the world.  Before their original videos were mysteriously removed from Google Video around December 7, 2007, several could be found on Google Video's Top 100 list at any given time. One video, based on Aqua's 1997 hit "Barbie Girl", was ranked as Google Video's 8th most popular video  overall. Fans have dedicated tribute or remake videos to the pair.

In July 2006, Lynne and Tessa won the Google Idol Pop Webcam Competition 3. In December 2006 and January 2007, they hosted a lip-sync video contest on the German website clipfish.de.  In May 2007, in conjunction with Clipfish, the duo hosted a TV program, The Lynne & Tessa Show, which aired on the German network channel RTL2 on the evening of May 28, 2007. The show consisted of a collection of humorous video clips that have circulated on the internet, intermixed with commentary and several short skits by Lynne and Tessa. Viewership was below expectations, and Tessa subsequently announced in her blog that by mutual agreement no more shows will be produced. In September, 2007, the two made an odd video which appeared to be part of an online marketing scheme for a new Pringles product. They made no further videos or media appearances since late 2007 and returned to being full-time students.

Notes

References

External links 
Official Lynne & Tessa Homepage (English)

1986 births
Living people
Musicians from Frankfurt
Internet memes
Entertainer duos